Zanina is a commune in the Cercle of Koutiala in the Sikasso Region of southern Mali. The commune covers an area of 125 square kilometers and includes 3 villages. In the 2009 census it had a population of 7,492. The village of Débéla, the administrative centre (chef-lieu) of the commune, is 45 km northwest of Koutiala.

References

External links
.

Communes of Sikasso Region